The American country music duo Sugarland has released six studio albums for Mercury Nashville and 18 singles, including one as a featured artist. Founded in 2002 as a trio composed of Kristian Bush, Kristen Hall, and Jennifer Nettles, they have recorded as a duo since Hall's departure in December 2005.

Their debut single, "Baby Girl" peaked at #2 on the Billboard Hot Country Singles & Tracks chart. This made it the highest-charting debut single for a country group in 13 years, and set a record for the longest country chart run since the inception of Nielsen SoundScan. The song is included on their 2004 debut major-label album, Twice the Speed of Life, which has been certified three-times Platinum by the Recording Industry Association of America.

Love on the Inside, released in 2008, was Sugarland's first number one album, reaching that position on both the Top Country Albums and Billboard 200 charts. This album produced three straight Number One hits in "All I Want to Do", "Already Gone", and "It Happens". Sugarland released its fifth album, The Incredible Machine, on October 19, 2010. The album's first single, "Stuck Like Glue", was released to radio on July 20, 2010. The Incredible Machine was released on February 7, 2011 in the UK, with "Stuck Like Glue" released as the first UK single on January 31, 2011.

All of the group's albums have charted within the top three on the Country Albums chart, with three additionally reaching the top position on the all-genre Billboard 200. They have produced eleven top ten singles on the country charts, of which five reached number one.

In early 2006, Nettles sang guest vocals on a re-recording of Bon Jovi's "Who Says You Can't Go Home", which became a number-one country airplay hit. The group were featured on Matt Nathanson's 2011 single, "Run".

Studio albums

Compilation albums

Live albums

Singles

As lead artist

As featured artist

Other songs

Promotional singles

Other charted songs

Music videos
All of Sugarland's singles to date have featured an accompanying music video, with the exception of "It Happens" and "Little Miss". An album cut, "Love," featured a live performance video that rotated on CMT in early 2009. In addition, a concept video was filmed for another album cut, titled "Keep You," and was released in late 2009.

Notes

References

Country music discographies
Discographies of American artists